Greg Alexander Docherty (born 10 September 1996) is a Scottish professional footballer who plays for EFL Championship club Hull City as a midfielder. He has previously played for Hamilton Academical, Rangers, Shrewsbury Town and Hibernian.

Early and personal life
Docherty is from Milngavie and attended Douglas Academy. He is of Irish heritage, through his grandparents.

Club career

Hamilton
Docherty joined Hamilton Academical at the age of 9 and progressed through all academy levels from u10s to the first team, and turned professional in October 2012. He made his senior debut on 7 December 2013. In April 2015 he signed a new contract with the club, until the summer of 2017. He scored his first senior career goal on 9 May 2015, an 85th-minute equaliser in a 1–1 home draw against Partick Thistle.

On 28 May 2017 he scored the only goal of the two-legged 2016–17 Scottish Premiership playoff tie against Dundee United, ensuring Hamilton would remain in the top division for the next season. He signed a new contract in August 2017, until 2020.

Rangers
On 25 January 2018, Docherty signed for his boyhood club Rangers on a four-and-a-half-year contract. On 8 August 2018, Docherty joined League One side Shrewsbury Town on a season-long loan deal. At the end of the 2018–19 season he was voted Shrewsbury's Player of the Year.

Upon his return to Rangers for the 2019–20 season he made 5 appearances, but none after August, and in December 2019 he was linked with a move away from the club in the January transfer window. Docherty was loaned to Hibernian on 31 January, with Florian Kamberi moving in the opposite direction. Docherty had an immediate impact with Hibs, scoring in a 2–1 win at Kilmarnock on 16 February.  Following the formal conclusion of the truncated 2019/20 season, Docherty returned to his parent club in May 2020.

Hull City
On 20 August 2020, Docherty signed for Hull City on a three-year deal. He scored his first goal for the Tigers in a 1–1 draw away at Oxford United on 5 December 2020.

International career
Docherty has represented Scotland at under-17 and under-21 youth international levels. After Docherty was left out of the under-21 squad in September 2017, it was suggested in media reports that he may instead play for the Republic of Ireland.

Career statistics

Honours 
Hull City
 EFL League One : 2020–21

References

1996 births
Living people
People from Milngavie
Sportspeople from East Dunbartonshire
Scottish footballers
Scotland under-21 international footballers
Association football midfielders
Hamilton Academical F.C. players
Rangers F.C. players
Shrewsbury Town F.C. players
Hibernian F.C. players
Hull City A.F.C. players
Scottish Professional Football League players
English Football League players
Scottish people of Irish descent